Lost & Found is the debut studio album by English singer Jorja Smith. It was released on 8 June 2018 by FAMM, with distribution from The Orchard. Writing and recording for the album took place over five years in London and Los Angeles. The sessions featured contributions from producers such as Jeff Kleinman, Michael Uzowuru, Tom Misch, Maaike Lebbing, among others.

Lost & Found was acclaimed by music critics, who commended its composition, style, lyrical content and Smith's vocal delivery. It was included in several year-end best album lists and was nominated for the Mercury Prize. It debuted at number three on the UK Albums Chart and number one on the UK R&B Chart. Internationally the album performed moderately making appearances on charts in the United States, Australia, New Zealand and Ireland. It was supported by the singles: "Blue Lights", "Where Did I Go?", "Teenage Fantasy" and "February 3rd", and has gone on to be certified Gold in the UK and France.

Background 

In 2015 at the age of 18, Smith moved to London and was living with her aunt and uncle, working as a Starbucks barista, spending breaks recording lyrics into Voicenotes on her phone. Her move to London inspired the album's title, Smith travelled to Ladbroke Grove and had a realisation that she felt lost, yet knew exactly where she wanted to be: "I feel like wherever I go I'm still quite lost, but there's a sense of 'found' in that I'm right where I want to be. Lost and found is how I feel." During college Smith was researching racial discrimination towards students, which would influence "Blue Lights". The song was released to SoundCloud in early 2016 and featured a Dizzee Rascal sample. The song was picked up by Stormzy and Skrillex upon release, and in March 2017 Smith met with Drake to record vocals for his More Life playlist.

Smith followed an unconventional style when creating the album. Smith had already written all the album's songs before she decided she wanted to release an album. Her label suggested she pick songs from a list she had already worked on and create the album from them. Unlike other albums Lost & Found has no concept and instead was a collection of songs written by Smith from the age of 16 to 21. Smith co-wrote "The One" with her boyfriend and producer Joel Compass. The night before the song was conceived Smith and Compass decided not to make their relationship official as Smith was set to go on tour to America. This led Smith and Compass to create "The One" which discusses meeting the right person at the wrong time.

Release and promotion 
In 2016, Smith began releasing songs online including "Blue Lights" and "Where Did I Go?".
She performed unreleased tracks "The One" and "On Your Own" during her set at the 2018 Coachella Valley Music and Arts Festival on 15 April 2018 and announced the title Lost & Found through her social media accounts on 20 April 2018. That same month, she made her American late-night television debut on Jimmy Kimmel Live! with a performance of "Blue Lights".

Singles 
In January 2016, Smith released her debut single "Blue Lights", which samples Dizzee Rascal's song "Sirens", on SoundCloud; the song garnered 400,000 plays on the website within a month.

On 5 June 2017, Smith released "Teenage Fantasy".

Critical reception 

Lost & Found received widespread acclaim from music critics. On Metacritic, the album received a weighted average score of 81, based on 16 reviews, indicating "universal acclaim". Ryan Patrick of Exclaim! praised the album, writing that it is "safe yet edgy, simple yet complex, ambitious yet relaxed" and a "solid start" for Smith. Lewis Lister of Clash described Lost & Found as "a brilliant first draft" while commending the album's production and stylistic blends. Ludovic Hunter-Tilney of Financial Times believed the album "comes across as thoughtful and authentic, the true measure of its success" and that it is "a composed piece of work." Simon Edwards of The Line of Best Fit described it as a "polished pop" album that is "skilfully arranged so that most music fans will be able to unearth some element that they can relate to." Leigh Sanders of Express & Star concluded that Lost & Found is "polished with a full sound, a mixture of pop and R&B that sounds intimate and delicate given her often softer approach to vocals."

Kieren Yates of The Guardian wrote that Lost & Found is "a well-paced album full of gentle vocals, catchy pop hooks and a playful relationship with the pains of youth, love and insecurity", although the "sparse and uninspiring production doesn't save the songs from feeling forgettable at times." In Variety, Jem Aswad said that the album "lingers by the exit — the last three tracks all feel like closers" but is cohesive and can appeal to different audiences.

In a mixed review, Thomas Smith of NME, found the album a "drag" and that it "often relies too heavily on the jazz-tinged R&B formula", adding that "the record is far more entertaining when she deviates from the template."

Accolades 
Lost & Found was nominated for a Mercury Prize, with the album being one of 12 to be shortlisted for the award.

Commercial performance 
The album debuted at number three on the UK Albums Chart for the week dated 15 June 2018, selling a total of 7,390 album-equivalent units. It also debuted at number four on the UK's Official Record Store Chart, which consists of the UK's biggest albums of the week sold through 100 UK independent record shops, based on sales of CDs, vinyl and other formats. As of September 2018, the album had sold 41,983 copies in the United Kingdom. The album was later certified silver by the British Phonographic Industry for shipments of 60,000 copies.

Track listing 

Notes
  signifies an additional producer

Sample credits
 "Blue Lights" contains a sample of "Amour, émoi... et vous", written and performed by Guy Bonnet and Roland Romanell; and "Sirens" written and performed by Dizzee Rascal.

Personnel 
Credits adapted from Tidal album liner notes.
 Jorja Smith – vocals

Production
 Charlie Perry – production 
 Cadenza – production 
 Michael Uzowuru – production 
 Kito – additional production , vocal production 
 Felix Joseph – production 
 Joice – production 
 Tom Misch – production 
 Ed Thomas – production 
 Engine Earz – additional production 
Technical
 Ricky Damian – engineering 
 Nitin Sawhney – programming 
 Daniel Trachtenberg – engineering 
 Antonio Feola – engineering 
 Engine Earz – mixing , mastering 

Instrumentation
 Charlie Perry – bass , keyboards 
 Anna Phoebe – violins 
 Mutale Chashi – bass 
 David Dyson – drums , percussion 
 Nitin Sawhney – strings , orchestration , arranger 
 Felix Joseph – synths , bass , drums 
 Michael Stafford – guitar 
 DJ Complexion – cuts 
 Benjamin Totten – guitar 
 Ed Thomas – bass , piano 
 Femi Koleoso – drums 
 Mike Excell – live drums 
 Amané Suganami – piano

Charts

Weekly charts

Year-end charts

Certifications

Release history

See also 
List of UK R&B Albums Chart number ones of 2018

References

External links 
 

2018 debut albums
Jorja Smith albums
Albums produced by Michael Uzowuru